Derek Edward Scott (born 8 February 1958) is an English former professional footballer who made more than 400 appearances in the Football League playing as a right-sided full-back for Burnley and Bolton Wanderers.

References

1958 births
Living people
Footballers from Gateshead
English footballers
Association football fullbacks
Burnley F.C. players
Bolton Wanderers F.C. players
Colne Dynamoes F.C. players
English Football League players